Robert West is professor of health psychology at University College London (UCL) and director of tobacco studies at the Cancer Research UK Health Behaviour Research Centre there. He is also editor-in-chief of the journal Addiction. He is a specialist in the psychology of addiction.

References

External links 
http://www.rjwest.co.uk/

Living people
Year of birth missing (living people)
Academics of University College London
Alumni of the University of London
British psychologists
Academics of Royal Holloway, University of London
Addiction medicine